Rawshan Jamil (8 May 1931 – 14 May 2002) was a Bangladeshi actress and dancer. She was awarded Ekushey Padak in the dance category in 1995 and Bangladesh National Film Award for Best Supporting Actress for her role in the film Noyonmoni (1976).

Early life and education 
Jamil was born in Dhaka. Her father was Abdul Karim. After passing the matriculation exam, Jamil got admission at Shilpakala Bhavan in Wari. She later married the dance instructor Ganesh Nath (later Gauhar Jamil) in 1952. Together they set up Jago Art Center in 1959.

Career 

Starting as an actress in television in 1965, Jamil acted in over 300 television plays, including Rakkhushi, Palabodol and Shokal Shondhya. She featured in around 200 films. Her film career started in 1967 with Alibaba Challish Chor.

Works

Films

Awards 
 Bangladesh National Film Award for Best Supporting Actress (1976), (1999)
 Bangladesh Film Journalist Association Award
 Tarakalok Puruskar
 Ekushey Padak (1995)

References

External links

1931 births
2002 deaths
Bangladeshi female dancers
20th-century Bangladeshi actresses
Recipients of the Ekushey Padak
Bangladeshi film actresses
Bangladeshi television actresses
Best Supporting Actress National Film Award (Bangladesh) winners
Bangladeshi choreographers
Eden Mohila College alumni
Best Supporting Actress Bachsas Award winners